Huamanripayoc (possibly from Quechua wamanripa Senecio, -yuq a suffix, "the one with the wamanripa") is a  mountain in the Chila mountain range in the Andes of Peru, about  high. It is located in the Arequipa Region, Castilla Province, Chachas District. Huamanripayoc lies at the Cacamayo (possibly from Quechua for "rock river"), northwest of Ticlla and northeast of Huayllayoc.

References

Mountains of Peru
Mountains of Arequipa Region